An extravaganza is a literary or musical work (often musical theatre) usually containing elements of burlesque, pantomime, music hall and parody in a spectacular production and characterized by freedom of style and structure. It sometimes also has elements of cabaret, circus, revue, variety, vaudeville and mime.  Extravaganza may more broadly refer to an elaborate, spectacular, and expensive theatrical production.

19th-century British dramatist, James Planché, was known for his extravaganzas.  Planché defined the genre as "the whimsical treatment of a poetical subject."

The term is derived from the Italian word stravaganza, meaning extravagance.

See also
Spectacle
Victorian burlesque

References

Comedy
Italian words and phrases
Musical theatre
Theatrical genres
Satire
Variety shows